The California Bowl (later the California Raisin Bowl) was a post-season college football bowl game played annually at Bulldog Stadium in Fresno, California, from 1981 to 1991. The game featured the champions of the Big West Conference (known prior to 1988 as the Pacific Coast Athletic Association) and the Mid-American Conference.

In 1988, the California Raisin Advisory Board purchased the naming rights to the bowl.

The game was dealt a severe blow in 1992 when Fresno State moved to the Western Athletic Conference. The MAC and Big West then moved their tie-ins to Las Vegas, Nevada and created the Las Vegas Bowl. The California Bowl made plans to hold the 1992 game without tie-ins, but was unable to find a new sponsor. When organizers came up short of a $1.75 million fundraising goal, the NCAA pulled the bowl's certification. It has never returned.

Game results

* UNLV won this game, but subsequently forfeited its entire schedule due to the use of ineligible players earlier in the season.''

MVPs

Appearances by team

Appearances by conference

See also
List of college bowl games

References

 
Defunct college football bowls